Him Sivorn (born 1970) is a popular female singer in Cambodia. She was one of the singers who performed at Phnom Penh's Olympic Stadium in celebration of parliamentarian Hun Many being awarded the Gusi Peace Prize in 2015.

References

21st-century Cambodian women singers
20th-century Cambodian women singers
People from Prey Veng province
Living people
1970 births